Stephanie Vogt and Kathinka von Deichmann successfully defended their title by defeating Roseanne Dimech and Elaine Genovese 6–1, 7–6 in the final.

Draw

Draw

References
 Main Draw

Women's Doubles